Silver Pictures is an American film production company founded by Hollywood producer Joel Silver in 1980. 

For many years, during the mid-1980s, the production company was based at 20th Century-Fox, but the production company was shifted to Warner Bros. in 1987. In 1999, it launched, along with fellow Tales from the Crypt member Robert Zemeckis, Dark Castle Entertainment, which served as a venture of the studio.

In 2012, Joel Silver and Warner Bros. ended their 25-year production, marketing, and distribution relationship, due to Silver disagreeing with how Warner Bros. had been handling the marketing and releasing of the films his company produced. Despite having split, Silver and Warner Bros. co-produced The Nice Guys four years later. That same year, Joel Silver and Universal Studios struck a 5-year marketing and distribution deal, starting with the Liam Neeson action thriller Non-Stop on February 28, 2014. Universal Pictures will not be a production partner with Silver Pictures, only a distributor.

Three years after Silver finalized Silver Pictures 5-year marketing and distributing deal with Universal, the veteran producer connected with Canadian financier Daryl Katz. Founder and chairman of the Katz Group of Companies, one of Canada's largest privately owned enterprises, Daryl Katz holds operations in pharmaceuticals, sports and entertainment and real estate. The two came together to create a slate of feature films, digital projects and television shows. Hal Sadoff, longtime packaging and finance agent, will serve as chief executive officer of Silver Pictures Entertainment. Sadoff left ICM in 2012. On November 13, 2015, Silver Pictures Television had received a commitment to a first-look agreement with Lionsgate Television whereas Silver would develop projects for the studio.

Before Silver's connection with Katz, Silver Pictures required studio backing to develop and fund its films. After the formation of the new partnership, Silver possessed the ability to work on projects both inside and outside the studio system.

CEO Hal Sadoff and Silver still possess a longstanding relationship, having worked together on Gothika, Thirteen Ghosts and House on Haunted Hill.

On June 24, 2019, Sadoff announced Silver's resignation from the company.

Productions

References 

American companies established in 1980
Companies based in Los Angeles
Mass media companies established in 1980
Film production companies of the United States